Descalzi is an Italian surname. It is pronounced . Notable people with the surname include:

 Cayetano Descalzi (born Gaetano Descalzi) (1809–1886), Italian painter and engraver active in Argentina
 Claudio Descalzi (born 1955), Italian businessman in the energy sector
 Giuseppe Gaetano Descalzi (1767-1855), Genoese furniture maker

Italian-language surnames